Richard Carlile (8 December 1790 – 10 February 1843) was an important agitator for the establishment of universal suffrage and freedom of the press in the United Kingdom.

Early life 
Born in Ashburton, Devon, he was the son of a shoemaker who died in 1794; leaving Richard's mother struggling to support her three children on the income from running a small shop. At the age of six he went for free education to the local Church of England school, then at the age of twelve he left school for  a seven-year apprenticeship to a tinsmith in Plymouth.

Personal life
In 1813 he married, and shortly afterwards the couple moved to Holborn Hill in London where he found work as a tinsmith. Jane Carlile gave birth to five children, three of whom survived.

Some time after 1829, Carlile met Eliza Sharples and she became his common law wife. Together they had at least four children.

Politics and publishing 
 
 
His interest in politics was kindled first by economic conditions in the winter of 1816 when Carlile was put on short-time work by his employer creating serious problems for the family: "I shared the general distress of 1816 and it was this that opened my eyes." He began attending political meetings where speakers like Henry Hunt complained that only three men in a hundred had the vote, and was also influenced by the publications of William Cobbett.

As a way of making a living he sold the writings of parliamentary reformers such as Tom Paine on the streets of London, often walking "thirty miles for a profit of eighteen pence". In April 1817 he formed a publishing business with the printer William Sherwin and rented a shop in Fleet Street. To make political texts such as Paine's books The Rights of Man and the Principles of Government available to the poor he split them into sections which he sold as small pamphlets, similarly publishing The Age of Reason and Principles of Nature. He issued unauthorized copies of Southey's Wat Tyler and after the radical William Hone's arrest in May, he reissued the parody of parts of the Book of Common Prayer for which Hone was to be tried,  then was himself arrested in August and held without charge until Hone was acquitted in December.

He took on distributing the banned Radical weekly The Black Dwarf at a time when the government was prosecuting publishers: "The Habeas Corpus Act being suspended ... all was terror and alarm, but I take credit to myself in defeating the effect of these two Acts upon the Press... Of imprisonment I made sure, but I felt inclined to court it than to shrink from it".

Carlile then brought out a radical journal, Sherwin's Political Register, which reported political meetings and included extracts from books and poems by supporters of the reform movement such as Percy Bysshe Shelley and Lord Byron. The popularity of this helped to soon bring his profit from his publishing venture to £50 a week.

Peterloo and The Republican 

Carlile was one of the scheduled main speakers at the reform meeting on 16 August 1819 at St. Peter's Fields in Manchester. Just as Henry Hunt was about to speak, the crowd was attacked by the yeomanry in what became known as the Peterloo massacre.  Carlile escaped and was hidden by radical friends before he caught the mail coach to London and published his eyewitness account, giving the first full report of what had happened, in Sherwin's Weekly Political Register of 18 August 1819. His placards proclaimed "Horrid Massacres at Manchester".

The government responded by closing Sherwin's Political Register, confiscating the stock of newspapers and pamphlets. Carlile changed the name to The Republican and in its issue of 27 August 1819 demanded that "The massacre... should be the daily theme of the Press until the murderers are brought to justice.... Every man in Manchester who avows his opinions on the necessity of reform, should never go unarmed – retaliation has become a duty, and revenge an act of justice."

Carlile was prosecuted for blasphemy, blasphemous libel and sedition for  publishing material that might encourage people to hate the government in his newspaper, and for publishing Tom Paine's Common Sense, The Rights of Man and the Age of Reason (which criticised the Church of England). In October 1819 he was found guilty of blasphemy and seditious libel and sentenced to three years in Dorchester Gaol with a fine of £1,500. When he refused to pay the fine, his premises in Fleet Street were raided and his stock was confiscated. While he was in jail he continued to write articles for The Republican which was now published by Carlile's wife, Jane, and thanks to the publicity it now outsold pro-government newspapers such as The Times.

To curb newspapers the government had raised the ½d tax on newspapers, first imposed in 1712, to 3½d in 1797, then 4d in 1815. From December 1819 it set a minimum price of 7d, with further restrictions. At a time when workers earned less than 10 shillings (120d.) a week this made it hard for them to afford radical newspapers, and publishers tried various strategies to evade the tax. Groups would pool their resources in reading societies and subscription societies to purchase a book or journal in common, and frequently read it aloud to one another as was the case with James Wilson.

By 1821, Carlile was a declared atheist (having previously been a Deist) and published his Address to Men of Science, in favour of materialism and education. In the same year Jane Carlile was in turn sentenced to two years imprisonment for seditious libel, and her place as publisher was taken by Richard Carlile's sister, Mary. Within six months she was imprisoned for the same offence. The process was repeated with eight of his shop workers, including Susannah Wright, and over 150 men and women were sent to prison for selling The Republican. Carlile's sentence ended in 1823 but he was immediately arrested and returned to prison for not paying his £1,500 fine, so the process continued until he was eventually released on 25 November 1825. In the next edition of The Republican he expressed the hope that his long confinement would result in the freedom to publish radical political ideas. An example of the support he received from around the country is the £1.5.1 sent to him in Dorchester jail by forty working men in the West Yorkshire village of Hunslet, accompanied by a noble letter on behalf of those "few Friends to Truth and Justice".

He then published further journals, The Lion which campaigned against child labour and The Promptor. He argued that "equality between the sexes" should be the objective of all reformers, and in 1826 published Every Woman's Book advocating birth control and the sexual emancipation of women. Cobbett denounced this book as "so filthy, so disgusting, so beastly, as to shock even the lewdest men and women".

Carlile was an advocate of the Christ myth theory. He did not believe that Jesus existed. He debated Unitarian minister John Relly Beard in The Republican, 1826.

The Devil's Chaplain 

He joined up with the radical and sceptical clergyman Robert Taylor and set out on an "infidel home missionary tour" which reached Cambridge on Thursday 21 May 1829 and caused a considerable upset to the University of Cambridge where a young Charles Darwin was a second-year student.

At their meeting in Bolton, Lancashire, Carlile met Eliza Sharples, who was to become his long term mistress.

Carlile then opened a ramshackle building on the south bank of the River Thames, the Blackfriars Rotunda, and in widespread public unrest in July 1830 this became a gathering place for republicans and atheists. Taylor staged infidel melodramas, preaching outrageous sermons which got him dubbed "The Devil's Chaplain". Thousands of copies of these sermons were circulated in a seditious publication, The Devil's Pulpit.

Jailed again 
In 1831 he was jailed, under the charge of seditious libel, given two and a half years for writing an article in support of agricultural labourers campaigning against wage cuts and advising the strikers to regard themselves as being at war with the government. He left prison deeply in debt, and government fines had taken from him the finances needed to publish newspapers.

His political and social opinions never altered, but his philosophy underwent a change in the 1830s. In 1837 H. Robinson published the results of his later thinking in the book Extraordinary Conversion and Public Declaration of Richard Carlile of London to Christianity.

In 1834, he was tried for creating a public nuisance, when he displayed two effigies in the windows of his shop at 62 Fleet Street, one in blue representing a broker titled "Temporal broker" and another dressed as a bishop titled "Spiritual broker". A large group of people were often gathered there, impeding traffic and causing quarrels. He was found guilty, but judgment was respited.

After living for some years in extreme poverty in Enfield, Carlile returned to Fleet Street in 1842, dying there the following year. He donated his body for medical research. Large numbers of people attended his funeral in Kensal Green Cemetery on Sunday 26 February 1843, where his sons protested at the Christian burial rite being administered in the common grave he was being buried in – citing that he "passed his life in opposition to all priestcraft."

Writings
 The Deist; or, Moral Philosopher: Being an Impartial Inquiry After Moral and Theological Truths (1819)
A Letter to the Society for the Suppression of Vice: On Their Malignant Efforts to Prevent a Free Enquiry After Truth and Reason (1819)
An Address to Men of Science: Calling Upon Them to Stand Forward and Vindicate the Truth from the Foul Grasp and Persecution of Superstition (1821)
Life of Thomas Paine: Written Purposely to Bind With His Writings (1822)
The Character of the Jew Books: Being a Defence of the Natural Innocence of Man, against Kings and Priests, or Tyrants and Impostors (1822)
Every Woman's Book or What is Love? (1826)

Notes

References 
 
Adrian Desmond and James Moore, Darwin (London: Michael Joseph, the Penguin Group, 1991). 

 Michael Laccohee Bush, The Friends and Following of Richard Carlile: a Study of Infidel Republicanism in Early Nineteenth-Century Britain, Twopenny Press, 2016

External links 

Richard Carlile (Parliamentary reform)
Richard Carlile – Reformer
Richard Carlile – Famous Quotations
Newspapers and publishers at dawn of 19th century
The Republican
The campaign for a free press
Manual of Freemasonry
 
 

1790 births
1843 deaths
19th-century atheists
19th-century British newspaper publishers (people)
19th-century English criminals
19th-century English writers
19th-century male writers
Atheist feminists
British atheism activists
British birth control activists
British male criminals
Christ myth theory proponents
English activists
English atheists
English feminist writers
English male non-fiction writers
English prisoners and detainees
English reformers
Freethought writers
Male feminists
People convicted of blasphemy
People from Ashburton, Devon
Prisoners and detainees of England and Wales
Rationalists
Tinsmiths